Francisco Calvo Serraller (19 April 1948 – 16 November 2018) was a Spanish art historian.

Life
He was born in 1948 in Madrid.

Career
Calvo Serraller completed his Doctorate in Philosophy and Literature specializing in History at the Complutense University. He was a member of the Royal Academy of Fine Arts of San Fernando from 2001 until his death. He was Director of the Prado Museum. He was a regular contributor to the newspaper El País, since its founding in 1976.

Bibliography
Some of his books are:
 Spain, Half a Century of Avant-Garde Art (1985).
 The Art seen by Artists (1987).
 Vanguard and Tradition in Contemporary Spanish Art (1989).
 The Novel of the Artist (1991).
 Encyclopedia of 20th Century Spanish Art (1992).
 Grandes Maestros de la Pintura|The Greatest Masters of Art and its Paintings (1993) (Illustrated by Willi Glasauer).
 Brief History of the Prado Museum (1994).
 The Romantic Image of Spain: Art and Architecture of the 19th Century (1995).
 El Greco (1995).
 Las Meninas de Velázquez (1996).
 Columnary: Reflections by an Art Critic (1998).
 Freedom of Exhibition: A Different Art History (2000).
 Contemporary Art (2001).
 The Genres of Painting (2005).

References

External links
 

Complutense University of Madrid alumni
Directors of the Museo del Prado
Spanish art historians
1948 births
2018 deaths